Craugastor loki is a species of frog in the family Craugastoridae.
It is found in Belize, El Salvador, Guatemala, Honduras, and Mexico.
Its natural habitats are subtropical or tropical moist lowland forests, subtropical or tropical moist montane forests, plantations, and rural gardens.
It is threatened by habitat loss.

References

loki
Amphibians of Belize
Amphibians of El Salvador
Amphibians of Guatemala
Amphibians of Honduras
Amphibians of Mexico
Amphibians described in 1955
Taxonomy articles created by Polbot